Here to Heaven is the debut and only album by Jamie-Lynn Sigler.  It features the single "Cry Baby". Three of the album's songs were also recorded in Spanish.

Although the album charted at #24 on the Billboard Heatseekers Album chart and #32 on the Billboard Independent Albums chart, it was a critical and commercial failure and had low sales, despite promotions and Sigler appearing on Total Request Live often during the album's debut. Sigler had initially stated that she thought the album would be a wonderful success and raise her career up to new levels.  In a May 2007 interview with Vegas magazine, Sigler said she was "embarrassed" by the album and regrets releasing it, saying it was mostly rushed to market due to her role as Meadow Soprano on The Sopranos.

Track listing 
 "Cry Baby"
 "Bada Bing"
 "Pressure"
 "He Wouldn't Listen to My Dreams"
 "Ole Ole"
 "Little Mr. Heartbreak"
 "You Are My Heart (Tu Eres)"
 "Giving Up On You"
 "Come With Me"
 "Sin Ti (Without You)"
 "Ole Ole" (Spanish Version)
 "Sin Ti (Without You)" (Spanish Version)
 "You Are My Heart (Tu Eres)" (Spanish Version)

References

2001 debut albums
Jamie-Lynn Sigler albums
Edel Music albums